The European Parliament election of 2009 took place on 6–7 June 2009.

The People of Freedom (29.3%) and Lega Nord (28.4%) were tied at the top in Veneto, while the Democratic Party (20.3%) was a distant third.

Results
Source: Regional Council of Veneto

Elections in Veneto
European Parliament elections in Italy
2009 European Parliament election
2009 elections in Italy